John Tolson D.D. (died 16 December 1644) was an English academic administrator at the University of Oxford.

Tolson was elected Provost (head) of Oriel College, Oxford on 29 June 1621, a post he held until his death in 1644.
During his time as Provost of Oriel College, he was also Pro-Vice-Chancellor and Vice-Chancellor of Oxford University.
In 1642, at the start of the English Civil War, the Vice-Chancellor John Prideaux left Oxford to take up his position as Bishop of Worcester without formally resigning. His duties were discharged by the Pro-Vice-Chancellors Robert Pincke and then John Tolson. On 7 February 1643, Tolson formally became Vice-Chancellor.

References

Year of birth missing
1644 deaths
Provosts of Oriel College, Oxford
Vice-Chancellors of the University of Oxford
Pro-Vice-Chancellors of the University of Oxford